Fazal Ilahi or Fazal Elahi is a male given name. Notable people with the name include:

 Fazal Ilahi Wazirabadi (1882–1951), Pakistani Islamic scholar and freedom fighter
 Fazal Ilahi (died 1948), Pakistani politician
 Fazal Ilahi Chaudhry (1904–1982), fifth President of Pakistan
 Fazal Elahi, Pakistani politician

Masculine given names